Polythysana is a genus of moths in the family Saturniidae first described by Francis Walker in 1855.

Species
Polythysana apollina R. Felder & Rogenhofer, 1874
Polythysana cinerascens (Philippi, 1859)
Polythysana rubrescens (Blanchard, 1852)

References

Hemileucinae